Attila Mokos (born 13 December 1964) is a Slovak actor who holds Hungarian nationality. He is a two-time winner of the Best Actor award at the Sun in a Net Awards, having won it in 2010 for his role in Soul at Peace, and again in 2014 for his role in the 2013 film Fine, Thanks (Ďakujem, dobře).

Selected filmography 
Cruel Joys (2002)
Broken Promise (2009)
Soul at Peace (2009)
Gypsy (2011)
The House (2011)
Apricot Island (2011)
Seven Days of Sin (2012)
Fine, Thanks (2013)
Búrlivé víno (television, 2014–2015)
A Step into the Dark (2014)
Rex (television, 2017)
The Interpreter (2018)

References

External links

1964 births
People from Levice District
Living people
Hungarians in Slovakia
Slovak male film actors
Slovak male stage actors
Slovak male television actors
20th-century Slovak male actors
21st-century Slovak male actors
Hungarian male film actors
Hungarian male stage actors
Hungarian male television actors
20th-century Hungarian male actors
21st-century Hungarian male actors
Sun in a Net Awards winners